Bugan, Bogan, Pakan, or Bugeng (布甘语, 布干语, or 布赓语) is an Austroasiatic language. The existence of the Bugan language was not known by the rest of world until recently. There are about 3000 speakers, mostly in some villages in southern Guangnan (广南) and northern Xichou (西畴), Yunnan Province, China. Bugan is an analytic language, and word order and auxiliary words have important functions in the grammar.

Distribution

Li Jinfang (1996)
According to Li Jinfang (1996), the Bugan-speaking population is distributed in seven villages across southern Guangnan (广南) and northern Xichou (西畴), Yunnan Province, China. As the language is highly uniform, it is not divided into any dialects.

Laowalong 老挖龙 (Bugan-only population); Bugan language: 
Xinwalong 新挖龙 (Bugan-only population); Bugan language: 
Jiuping 九平 (Bugan and Han Chinese population); Bugan language: 
Shibeipo 石北坡 (Bugan-only population); Bugan language: 
Xinzhai 新寨 (Bugan and Han Chinese population); Bugan language: 
Malong 马龙 (Bugan-only population); Bugan language: 
Nala 那拉 (Bugan and Han Chinese population)

Li Yunbing (2005)
According to a more recent survey by Li Yunbing (2005), the Bugan people, comprising a total of 500+ households and 2,700+ individuals, live in the following locations.

Laowalong 老挖龙, Nasa Township 那洒镇; Bugan language: 
Xinwalong 新挖龙; Bugan language: 
Xiaoping 小坪寨 ; Bugan language: 
Nala 那腊; Bugan language: 
Jiuping 九坪, Zhuanjiao Township 篆角乡 (Chongtian Township 冲天乡); Bugan language: 
Shibeipo 石碑坡; Bugan language: 
Manlong 曼龙; Bugan language: 

Li Yunbing also uses the term Bùgēng (布赓) in place of Bùgān (布甘).

People
They are an unrecognized ethnic minority, and are currently classified as Yi. The Bugan are endogamous, and thus do not usually marry people from other ethnic groups

The Bugan people also hold their own New Year's Day celebration in April of the Chinese lunar calendar, which is separate from that of the Han Chinese New Year.

Common Bugan surnames include Li 李, Wang 王, Guo 郭, Luo 罗, Yan 严, Lu 卢, Pu 普, and Yi.

Phonology
Bugan is a tonal SVO language. Unlike the Bolyu language, Bugan distinguishes between tense and lax voice qualities. In current linguistic publications on Bugan, tense voice is indicated by underlining vowels. Bugan has a total of 49 onsets (including various consonant clusters) and 67 possible rimes.

Notes

References

 
 
 

Pakanic languages
Languages of China